Chhatrapur is a Vidhan Sabha constituency of Ganjam district, Odisha.

This constituency includes Chhatrapur, Ganjam, Rambha, Chhatrapur block and Ganjam block.

Elected Members

Sixteen elections were held between 1951 and 2019.
Elected members from the Chhatrapur constituency are:
2019: (127): Subash Chandra Behera (BJD)
2014: (127): Priyanshu Pradhan (BJD)
2009: (127): Adikanda Sethi (CPI)
2004: (72): Nagireddy Narayan Reddy (CPI)
2000: (72): Rama Chandra Panda (BJP)
1995: (72): Daitari Behera  (Congress)
1990: (72): Parsuram Panda (CPI)
1985: (72): Ashok Kumar Choudhury (Congress)
1980: (72): Biswanath Sahu (CPI)
1977: (72): Biswanath Sahu (CPI)
1974: (72): Daitari Behera (Utkal Congress)
1971: (68): Lakshman Mahapatra (CPI)
1967: (68): Lakshman Mahapatra (CPI)
1961: (20):  Lakshman Mahapatra (CPI)
1957: (15): Yatiraj Proharaj (Congress)
1951: (102): V . Sitaramaya (Independent)

2019 Election Result

2014 Election Result
In 2014 election,  Biju Janata Dal candidate Priyanshu Pradhan defeated Communist Party of India candidate Krushna Chandra Nayak by a margin of 22,019 votes.

Summary of results of the 2009 Election
In 2009 election, Communist Party of India candidate Adikanda Sethi defeated Bharatiya Janata Party candidate Bhagaban Behera by a margin of 16,557 votes.

Notes

References

Assembly constituencies of Odisha
Politics of Ganjam district